Thiébaut Bischene (22 March 1903 – 6 November 1971) was a French racing cyclist. He rode in the 1929 Tour de France.

References

1903 births
1971 deaths
French male cyclists
Place of birth missing